Palpita picticostalis is a moth in the family Crambidae. It was described by George Hampson in 1896. It is found in Myanmar and on the Andaman Islands, as well as in Cambodia.

References

Moths described in 1896
Palpita
Moths of Asia